Wang Li-ling also known as Jennifer Wang, is Taiwanese politician. She was the Vice Chairperson of the Financial Supervisory Commission (FSC) from 2013 to 2016, when she was appointed chair.

Education
Wang obtained her bachelor's degree in Chinese literature from Fu Jen Catholic University. She then continued her study in the United States, obtaining her master's degree in accounting from University of Hartford and doctoral degree in risk management and insurance from Temple University.

Non-political career
Wang was appointed the Chairperson of the Department of Risk Management and Insurance of National Chengchi University in 2008–2011. She was the Director of First Financial Holding Co., Ltd. in 2009–2012. She was the Chairperson of Pension Fund Association in 2011–2013.

Political career
Wang was appointed as the Vice Chairperson of FSC in 2013. On 1 February 2016, she was appointed as the chairperson of the commission after small cabinet reshuffle.

References

Political office-holders in the Republic of China on Taiwan
Living people
University of Hartford alumni
Fu Jen Catholic University alumni
Temple University alumni
Academic staff of the National Chengchi University
Year of birth missing (living people)